Epic Beard Men is an American hip hop duo from Providence, Rhode Island. It consists of Sage Francis and B. Dolan.

Career
Having toured and worked with each other, Sage Francis and B. Dolan wanted to put aside time to create music together. However, the two couldn't find time in their schedules until they were invited to perform at the 2016 Edinburgh Festival Fringe. There, they started writing their new collaborative songs.

Epic Beard Men's official debut single, "War on Christmas", was released in 2017. In 2018, the duo released the Season 1 EP, as well as "Five Hearts", a single from the EP. In 2019, the duo released the first studio album, This Was Supposed to Be Fun. It includes "You Can't Tell Me Shit", which became The Strangers "Inbox Jukebox Track of the Day". The album was placed at number 20 on PopMatters "20 Best Hip-Hop Albums of 2019" list.

Discography

Studio albums
 This Was Supposed to Be Fun (2019)

EPs
 Season 1 (2018)

Singles
 "War on Christmas" (2017)
 "Five Hearts" (2018)

References

External links
 Epic Beard Men at Strange Famous Records
 

American hip hop groups
American musical duos
Musical groups from Providence, Rhode Island